Sanjeev Stalin (born 17 January 2001), is an Indian professional footballer who plays as a full back for Indian Super League club Mumbai City. He has represented India at various youth international levels including in the 2017 FIFA U-17 World Cup.

Club career

Youth and early career

Indian Arrows
Stalin was part of the AIFF Elite Academy batch that was preparing for the 2017 FIFA U-17 World Cup to be hosted in India. After the tournament, Stalin was selected to play for the Indian Arrows, an All India Football Federation-owned team that would consist of India under-20 players to give them playing time. He made his professional debut for the side in the Arrow's first match of the season against Chennai City. He started and helped the team keep the clean sheet as Indian Arrows won 3–0.

C.D. Aves
On 11 February 2020, Stalin signed a two-year deal at Portuguese Primeira Liga club C.D. Aves, where played for the club's U-19 and U-23 squads.

Sertanense
On 24 August 2020, Stalin joined Portuguese third division club Sertanense  for the 2020–21 season.

Kerala Blasters
On 18 March 2021, Indian Super League club Kerala Blasters FC announced the signing of Stalin on a 3-year deal. He made his debut for the club in the 2021 Durand Cup match against arch-rivals Bengaluru FC on 15 September, which they lost 2–0. Stalin made his Indian Super League debut in the match against Hyderabad FC on 9 January 2022 as substitute for injured Jessel Carneiro, which the Blasters won 1–0. On 26 February, in the match against their southern rivals Chennaiyin FC, he was awarded with the man of the match award for his performance, as the Blasters won 3–0 at full-time.

International career
Stalin represented the India under-17 side which participated in the 2017 FIFA U-17 World Cup which was hosted in India. On 9 October 2017, he assisted Jeakson Singh to score India's first ever goal in a FIFA tournament against Colombia. He was also a part of the India under-20 team and made appearances for the side.

Personal life
Sanjeev Stalin was born to his father, Stalin and mother Parameshwari, in Bangalore, Karnataka. His parents run a small garment shop and his mother is a Burmese Indian who emigrated back to India to help her nephew. At the age of 10 Stalin was spotted by Indo-Iranian coach Jamshid Nassiri who recommended that he should join a football academy.

Career statistics

Honours
Kerala Blasters
Indian Super League runner-up: 2021–22

See also
 List of Indian football players in foreign leagues

References

2001 births
Living people
Footballers from Bangalore
Indian footballers
India youth international footballers
Indian expatriate footballers
Indian people of Burmese descent
Association football defenders
AIFF Elite Academy players
Indian Arrows players
C.D. Aves players
Sertanense F.C. players
I-League players
Indian expatriates in Portugal
Kerala Blasters FC players
Kerala Blasters FC Reserves and Academy players
Indian Super League players